Mhlume United Football Club is a defunct Eswatinii soccer club based in Mhlume. It played in the Premier League of Eswatini.

History
The team was founded by merging two teams Mhlume Peacemakers and Mhlume FC. In 1981 Mhlume Peacemakers has won the Swazi Premier League.
In 2005 the club was dissolved by merging with Simunye FC to create a new club RSSC United FC.

Stadium
Currently the team plays at the Mhlume Stadium.

Honours
Swazi Premier League
Champion (1): 1981
Swazi Cup
Winner (1): 2000

References

External links
Team profile – soccerway.com
Team profile – The Biggest Football Archive of the World

Defunct football clubs in Eswatini
Association football clubs disestablished in 2005
2005 disestablishments in Africa